Lars Møller Madsen (born 30 May 1981 in Ølgod, Denmark) is a Danish team handball player. From 1 January 2011 he plays for the Swedish club IFK Kristianstad.

He is European Champion by winning the 2008 European Men's Handball Championship with the Danish national handball team.

External links
EM-truppen, Schweiz 2006 at Danish Handball Federation
Portrætfotos af Herre-A VM-truppen 2007 at Danish Handball Federation
EM-truppen, EM Norge 2008 at Danish Handball Federation

1981 births
Living people
People from Varde Municipality
Danish male handball players
IFK Kristianstad players
Sportspeople from the Region of Southern Denmark